Aris ob Kien Castle is a ruined medieval castle from the 12th Century. It is located in the municipality of Reichenbach im Kandertal in the Swiss canton of Bern.

History 
The castle was probably built in the 12th century as the family seat of the Freiherr von Kien.  In the 13th century they abandoned the castle and moved to their second castle, the nearby Mülenen Castle.  In 1934 the ruined castle was restored.

Location and description
The castle is located near the Kiene stream, a tributary of the Kander river.

The 1934 renovation cleared and repaired the remaining castle.  Today it is still well preserved, with parts of the castle tower, the moat, earthen walls and two ditches still visible.  However, a third trench is no longer visible.

References 

Castles in the Canton of Bern